Islamic education may refer to:

Islamic studies, the academic study of Islam and Islamic culture
Madrasah, the Arabic word for any type of educational institution
Islamic Education Society, an Islamic organization in India
Education in Islam